Meg Wolitzer (born May 28, 1959) is an American novelist, known for The Wife, The Ten-Year Nap, The Uncoupling, The Interestings, and The Female Persuasion. She works as an instructor in the MFA program at Stony Brook Southampton.

Life and career
Wolitzer was born in Brooklyn and raised in Syosset, New York, the daughter of novelist Hilma Wolitzer (née Liebman) and psychologist Morton Wolitzer. She was raised Jewish. Wolitzer studied creative writing at Smith College and graduated from Brown University in 1981.  She wrote her first novel, Sleepwalking, a story of three college girls obsessed with poetry and death, while still an undergraduate; it was published in 1982.  Her following books include Hidden Pictures (1986), This Is Your Life (1988), Surrender, Dorothy (1998), The Wife (2003), The Position (2005), The Ten-Year Nap (2008), The Uncoupling (2011), and  The Interestings (2013). Her short story "Tea at the House" was featured in 1998's Best American Short Stories collection.  Her novel for younger readers, The Fingertips of Duncan Dorfman, was published in 2011.

She also co-authored, with Jesse Green, a book of cryptic crosswords, Nutcrackers: Devilishly Addictive Mind Twisters for the Insatiably Verbivorous (1991), and has written about the relative difficulty women writers face in gaining critical acclaim.

She has taught creative writing at the University of Iowa's Writers' Workshop, Skidmore College, and, most recently, was a guest artist at Princeton University.  Over the past decade she has also taught at both Stony Brook Southampton's MFA in Creative Writing program and the Southampton Writers Conference and the Florence Writers Workshop. Three films have been based on her work: This Is My Life, scripted and directed by Nora Ephron; the 2006 made-for-television movie Surrender, Dorothy; and the 2017 drama The Wife, starring Glenn Close.

The Uncoupling was the subject of the first coast-to-coast virtual book club discussion, via Skype.

As of 2018, Wolitzer resides in the Upper West Side of Manhattan, with her husband, science writer Richard Panek.

Works

Novels
 Sleepwalking (1982) , 
 Hidden Pictures (1986)
 This Is Your Life (1988)
 Friends for Life 1994 , 
 Surrender, Dorothy (1998)
 The Wife (2003) , 
 The Position (2005)
 The Ten-Year Nap (2008) , 
 The Uncoupling (2011) , 
 The Fingertips of Duncan Dorfman (2011)
 The Interestings (2013) , 
 Belzhar (2014) , 
 The Female Persuasion (2018) , 
 To Night Owl from Dogfish (2019)

References

1959 births
Living people
20th-century American novelists
21st-century American novelists
American women novelists
American women short story writers
People from Syosset, New York
Brown University alumni
Smith College alumni
University of Houston faculty
Iowa Writers' Workshop faculty
20th-century American women writers
21st-century American women writers
20th-century American short story writers
21st-century American short story writers
Novelists from Texas
Novelists from Iowa
Writers from Brooklyn
Jewish American novelists
American women academics
21st-century American Jews